USS Magistrate (SP-143) was a Magistrate-class patrol boat acquired by the U.S. Navy for the task of patrolling the coasts and harbors of the United States.

Magistrate, a wooden hull gas powered boat, was built by Herreshoff Manufacturing Co., Bristol, Rhode Island, in 1916; acquired by the Navy under free lease from Henry S. Vanderbilt of New York City, 1 May 1917; delivered 14 May 1917; and commissioned 24 May 1917.

World War I service 
 
Assigned to the 2d Naval District, Magistrate patrolled waters at the eastern end of Long Island Sound while operating out of New London, Connecticut.

Post-war deactivation 

Following the end of World War I, she was returned to her owner 15 February 1919.

References

External links 
 Dictionary of American Naval Fighting Ships
 NavSource Online: Section Patrol Craft Photo Archive - Magistrate (SP 143)

Ships built in Bristol, Rhode Island
Patrol vessels of the United States Navy
1916 ships
World War I patrol vessels of the United States